International competitions in the sport of cyclo-cross in the 2010–11 season included the World Cup, Superprestige, and Gazet van Antwerpen (GVA) events. There were also national championships in a number of countries.

Race calendar

National Championships

2010 in cyclo-cross
2011 in cyclo-cross
Cyclo-cross by year